Bob Thompson (June 26, 1937 – May 30, 1966) was an African-American figurative painter known for his bold and colorful canvases, whose compositions were influenced by the Old Masters. His art has also been described as synthesizing Baroque and Renaissance masterpieces with the jazz-influenced Abstract Expressionist movement.

He was prolific in his eight-year career, producing more than 1,000 works before his death in Rome in 1966. The Whitney Museum mounted a retrospective of his work in 1998. He also has works in numerous private and public collections throughout the United States.

Early life and education
Robert Louis Thompson was born and raised in Louisville, Kentucky. His father died in a car crash when he was 13, and Thompson lived with relatives who exposed him to art and jazz. He was briefly a pre-med student at Boston University (1955–56) but dropped out and returned to the University of Louisville (1957–58), where he studied painting under German expressionist artist Ulfert Wilke, American surrealist painter Mary Spencer Nay, and Charles Crodel.

Career
In 1958 Thompson moved to New York City, where he formed friendships with jazz musicians such as Charlie Haden and Ornette Coleman while a regular at the jazz clubs The Five Spot and Slugs. He also formed friendships with writers Allen Ginsberg and LeRoi Jones in addition to fellow artists Lester Johnson, Red Grooms, Mimi Gross, Marcia Marcus  and Allan Kaprow, with whom he participated in some of the earliest Happenings. In 1960, he had his first solo exhibition at the Delancy Street Museum and later at the Martha Jackson Gallery where he had solo exhibitions in 1963–64, and 1965. Thompson exhibited at the Donald Morris Gallery in Detroit in 1965, which created significant interest in his work amongst local collectors. In 1968, The New School organized a solo exhibition of his work, as did the Speed Art Museum in 1971.

Personal life and death
He married in 1960 and moved with his wife Carol Plenda to Europe in 1961 after receiving a Whitney Foundation fellowship.  They went to London, Paris (staying at the so-called "Beat Museum" hotel) and to Spain, where they settled in Ibiza. Thompson wanted to draw inspiration from the European Old Masters, and perhaps also wanted to escape drugs. However, his drug use took its toll. He died from a heroin overdose following gall bladder surgery in Rome, Italy in 1966.  While Thompson had a relatively short career before his early death, he still managed to complete about 1,000 paintings and drawings.

Artistic style
Thompson spent much of his time during his early career visiting museums and drawing inspiration from earlier art. One of his major artistic goals was to reinterpret themes and subjects from the Old Masters. By synthesizing Baroque and Renaissance masterpieces with the jazz-influenced Abstract Expressionist movement, Thompson was able to make the art of the past more relevant for contemporary - and particularly African-American - audiences. In his early career, he typically painted large groups of figures in mainly earth tones.

In 1963, his focus shifted towards painting single, central events in brighter colors. He began to paint more expressively, combining traditional symbols and themes with his own imagination. Thematically, Thompson was inspired by the dichotomy of good and evil as well as the relationship between men and nature. His figures are often multi-colored and flat and reflect many of the basic elements of the Abstract Expressionist movement.

References

External links 
 Finding aid for the Bob Thompson papers at the University of Louisville's Margaret M. Bridwell Art Library.
 Finding aid for The New School Art Center records including papers on Bob Thompson's solo exhibition at The New School Archives and Special Collections.
 Bob Thompson in the Minneapolis Institute of Art, Minneapolis, MN

1966 deaths
1937 births
20th-century American painters
American male painters
People from Ibiza
Artists from Louisville, Kentucky
Painters from Kentucky
American expatriates in Spain
20th-century African-American painters
20th-century American male artists